Pisces may refer to:

 Pisces, an obsolete (because of land vertebrates) taxonomic superclass including all fish
Pisces (astrology), an astrological sign
Pisces (constellation), a constellation
Pisces Overdensity, an overdensity of stars in the Milky Way's halo that is situated in the Pisces constellation
Pisces II (dwarf galaxy), a satellite galaxy of the Milky Way
Pisces Dwarf, a satellite galaxy of the Triangulum Galaxy
Pisces (Chinese astronomy), the division of the sky in traditional Chinese uranography that lies across the modern constellation Pisces
PISCES (Personal Identification Secure Comparison and Evaluation System), a border control database system administered by the United States Department of State
Pisces (album), a 1961 album by Art Blakey & the Jazz Messengers
Pisces (comics), a Marvel Comics character
Pisces-class deep submergence vehicle, a class of three-person research deep-submergence vehicles
NOAAS Pisces (R 226), an American fisheries and oceanographic research ship in commission in the National Oceanic and Atmospheric Administration since 2009
 Pisces (band), a psychedelic rock band
 "Pisces", a 2016 song by Jinjer